Wanasah is a free-to-air satellite television channel that screens music videos and programs and other variety programs. The channel is run by the MBC Group, one of the leading media groups in the Middle East, and is owned by Rashed Al-Majed, one of the most successful Arab superstars. Programs are in the Arabic language. It is available in the Middle East and the Horn of Africa by satellites Badr-4 and Nilesat 102. It was launched on 3 July 2007 with a live broadcast concert. The channel is aimed mainly at young audiences.

References

External links

Free-to-air
Television stations in Saudi Arabia
Arab mass media
Arabic-language television stations
Television channels and stations established in 2007
Middle East Broadcasting Center